Timothy Lee Duryea (born November 16, 1964) is an American college basketball coach who was men's basketball head coach at Utah State, and is currently an assistant coach at Boise State.

Early life and education
Born in Medicine Lodge, Kansas, Duryea grew up in Denton, Texas and graduated from Denton High School. Duryea played college basketball first at Pan American University (now the University of Texas Rio Grande Valley) with the Broncs in the 1984–85 season, then transferred to North Texas State University (now the University of North Texas) and played for the Mean Green from 1986 to 1988. A guard at both schools, Duryea was a team captain as a senior and helped North Texas State win the Southland Conference men's basketball tournament, which qualified the team for the 1988 NCAA Tournament. Duryea graduated from North Texas State in 1988 with a degree in business administration.

Coaching career
Duryea began his coaching career in 1988 at Colorado State as an assistant for Boyd "Tiny" Grant and remained on staff for two seasons. From 1993 to 1997, Duryea was an assistant at North Texas for Tim Jankovich. Duryea then joined Hutchinson Community College as an assistant in 1997 and was promoted to head coach in 1999. In two seasons, Duryea had a 44–21 record at Hutchinson.

On June 26, 2001, Stew Morrill added Duryea to his staff at Utah State as an assistant coach. In 2008, Morrill promoted Duryea to associate head coach. In fourteen total seasons with Duryea on staff, Utah State made six NCAA Tournaments and won five conference championships (the Big West in 2003 and Western Athletic Conference four straight years from 2008 to 2011). Duryea praised Morrill in a 2006 interview with Deseret News: "He provides a really stable working environment because he's so steady. He knows how he wants to run a program."

After Morrill retired, Utah State hired Duryea as head coach on March 30, 2015. In his first season as head coach, Utah State finished 16–15 (7–11 Mountain West Conference).

On March 11, 2018, the Utah State University Athletic department announced that Duryea had been fired from his coaching duties.

On April 24, 2018, Boise State hired Duryea as an assistant coach.

Head coaching record

Junior college

College

References

External links 
Tim Duryea Utah State Profile

1964 births
Living people
American men's basketball coaches
American men's basketball players
Basketball players from Texas
Colorado State Rams men's basketball coaches
Hutchinson Blue Dragons men's basketball coaches
North Texas Mean Green men's basketball coaches
North Texas Mean Green men's basketball players
Sportspeople from Denton, Texas
Texas–Pan American Broncs men's basketball players
Utah State Aggies men's basketball coaches
People from Medicine Lodge, Kansas
Basketball coaches from Texas
Guards (basketball)